Ningbo Rail Transit, also known as the Ningbo Metro, is a rapid transit system serving the city of Ningbo, Zhejiang and its suburbs. Six metro lines are being built inside the urban area of Ningbo, serving Haishu, Jiangbei, Zhenhai, Beilun and Yinzhou. The first phase of Line 1 started construction in June 2009 and began to service the public on May 30, 2014. Line 2 began service on September 26, 2015.

Ningbo Rail Transit is the second rapid transit system put into service in Zhejiang Province, after Hangzhou Metro.

Lines in operation 
, there are five lines in operation in the Ningbo Rail Transit system.

Line 1

Line 1 is the first metro line serving Ningbo. It stretches in the east–west direction, starting in the western town of Gaoqiao as a viaduct and turning into a tunnel as it approaches Haishu District. The tunnel stretches under Zhongshan Road, a main road in Ningbo, crossing the Fenghua River and entering Yinzhou District.  It then passes Ningbo East New Town and the town of Qiuga, crossing eastward into Beilun District through China National Highway 329 via elevated line. It then follows Taishan Road to Xiapu Station, the easternmost destination. The construction of the section between Gaoqiao West and Donghuan South Road began in June 2009 and passenger service began on May 30, 2014, making Ningbo Metro Line 1 the second subway line in Zhejiang Province. The extension of Line 1 between Donghuan South Road and Xiapu began trial operations on March 19, 2016.

Line 2 

Line 2 is the second metro line in Ningbo. It starts near Ningbo Lishe International Airport and stretches eastwards through tunnels. After reaching Yage'er Avenue it turns northwards and passes Ningbo Textile City, after which the route zigzags into Ningbo Coach Center and crosses Ningbo railway station eastwards, the main railway station of the city. The route extends northwards into Jiangbei District and turns eastwards until it reaches Lulin Market, where it turns into viaducts before reaching Qingshuipu station in Zhenhai District. This section of Line 2 opened on September 26, 2015. The line was later extended to Honglian station which opened on December 1, 2022.

Line 3 

Line 3 is the third metro line in Ningbo. It starts in Chenpodu area in Yinzhou District as underground route and go northwards into Yinzhou Central Area via Ningnan South Road and then turn into Songjiang Middle Road and go northeast until it reaches the Ningbo–Taizhou–Wenzhou railway and go into Jiangdong District via Zhongxing Road. Finally it crosses Yong River and reach Datong Bridge Station, the terminal of Phase I. The line will be extended further into Luotuo Town, Zhenhai District.

Yinfeng Line 

Yinfeng Line, also known as Ningbo–Fenghua Intercity Railway or Ningfeng Line, is a suburban metro line. It starts on the south of Gaotang Bridge station in south Yinzhou District, goes south until it reaches the Ningbo Ring Expressway and turns into an elevated line and enters the Huanzhen North Road of Jiangshan Town. After reaching Jiangshan Station, it turns east into Yanhu Road and passes Yinzhou Industrial Park and Yongjiang Village until it reaches Fangqiao and turns south again along Donghuan Road before it reaches its destination, Jinhai Road Station.

Line 4 

Line 4 starts from Cicheng Station in Cicheng Town and turns south into the North External Ring Viaduct where it turns east–west. After reaching Jiangbei Avenue, it starts to turn underground and deviates from the viaduct to Zhuangqiao railway station where it turns south, crosses Yaojiang River and reaches Ningbo railway station. Then Line 4 goes along Changchun Road, Xingning Road until it reaches Canghai Road and become north–south again. After reaching Shounan Road it turns into southeast direction and reaches Dongqian Lake, its destination.

Line 5 

Line 5 starts from Buzheng Station in western Yinzhou District as an underground line. Then it goes along Yinxian Road and passes the Fenghua River until it reaches Xiaying and turns north. Then the line goes along first Haiyan Road and then Yuanshi Road. Then the line passes the Yong River and reaches its destination, Xingzhuang Road Station.

Lines under construction and under planning
According to the "Ningbo Rail Transit Construction Plan (2013-2020)" approved by the NDRC, Line 1 to Line 4 and the Phase 1 of Line 5 will be completed before 2020, the total length of Ningbo Rail Transit will be 173.1 kilometers.

In December 2020, the "2021-2026 Construction Plan of Ningbo Rail Transit" was approved by NDRC. The plan includes first phase of Lines 6, 7 and 8 as well as extensions to Line 1 and 4, totaling 106.5km of new lines. Additionally, late stage planning work is underway on two regional express metro lines to Cixi and Xiangshan.

Rolling stock

CSR Zhuzhou provides 22 six-car trains for Line 1. Some trains are assembled in Ningbo locally.

Network Map

References

External links

 Ningbo Rail Transit (official site)

 
Rapid transit in China
Rail Transit
Rail transport in Zhejiang
Railway lines opened in 2014
2014 establishments in China